The men's Kurash +90 kilograms competition at the 2018 Asian Games in Jakarta, Indonesia was held on 28 August at the JCC Assembly Hall.

Schedule
All times are Western Indonesia Time (UTC+07:00)

Results

Final

Top half

Bottom half

References

External links
Official website

men's 91 kg